Domaine Lamarche (Domaine François Lamarche) is a winery in the Burgundian village of Vosne-Romanée. The domaine was founded in 1797.

Its vineyard holdings include Clos Vougeot, Echezeaux, Grands Echezeaux, and the monopole La Grande Rue.

References

External links
Official website

Burgundy (historical region) wine producers